Naukunda is a Rural municipality located within the Rasuwa District of the Bagmati Province of Nepal.
The municipality spans  of area, with a total population of 11,824 according to a 2011 Nepal census.

On March 10, 2017, the Government of Nepal restructured the local level bodies into 753 new local level structures.
The previous Yarsa, Saramthali and half portion of Bhorle VDCs were merged to form Naukunda Rural Municipality.
Naukunda is divided into 6 wards, with Saramthali declared the administrative center of the rural municipality.

References

External links
official website of the rural municipality

Rural municipalities in Rasuwa District
Rural municipalities of Nepal established in 2017